List of United States Air Force support squadrons identifies the United States Air Force squadron, shield, location and support unit. A support squadron supplies all the necessary manpower and equipment needed to continue numerous tasks.  An operations support squadron may dictate policy, train aircrews, and maintain airfields based on the missions of the units it supports.  This type of unit will also staff the control tower and supply weather forecasts for bases and aircrews.

Logistics Support Squadrons

Operations Support Squadrons

Range Support Squadrons

Tactical Air Support Squadrons

Training Support Squadrons

See also
 List of United States Air Force squadrons

References

Support